Ashley Elizabeth Hansen Church (born May 5, 1990) is an American, former collegiate All-American, right-handed softball player originally from Chandler, Arizona. Hansen played at Stanford University from 2009 to 2012 as a shortstop and is the school doubles leader and also ranks top-5 in the Pac-12 Conference and the NCAA Division I for the career category.

Playing career
She was a four-time First Team All-Pac-12 player and was also named the Newcomer of the Year (2009), Player of the Year (2011) and Defensive Player of The Year (2012) during her career. She was named the 2011 USA Softball Collegiate Player of the Year. She was then only the second position player to win the award, along with UCLA's Stacey Nuveman in 2002. Hansen also played on the US National Team in 2009 and 2010. Hansen helped team USA win the gold medal at the 2010 ISF Women's World Championship.

Statistics

References

External links
 

1990 births
Living people
Stanford Cardinal softball players
Sportspeople from Chandler, Arizona
Softball players from Arizona